We Be Hound'n is the third album released by rap group, Partners-N-Crime. it was released on June 22, 1999 for South Coast Music and was produced by Leroy "Precise" Edwards. We Be Hound'n peaked at #92 on the Top R&B/Hip-Hop Albums.

Track listing
"Intro"
"We Be Hound'n"
"17 Shots"
"Shake Some'em"
"Pussy Right Chere"
"We Came Here to Party"
"Da Car Wash"
"Punks Jump Up and Get Beat Down"
"Having Dreams"
"Jail Call"
"A Chance"
"La La Land"
"Da Phone Call"
"Tameka and Keisha"
"Why Do-U-Do Me Like Dat?"
"We Going"
"Da Set"
"Black Folks"
"Be Home In A Minute"
"Sprung"

1999 albums
Partners-N-Crime albums